Lkhamaasürengiin Badamsüren (born 28 May 1972) is a Mongolian judoka. She competed in the women's half-middleweight event at the 1992 Summer Olympics.

References

External links
 

1972 births
Living people
Mongolian female judoka
Olympic judoka of Mongolia
Judoka at the 1992 Summer Olympics
Place of birth missing (living people)
20th-century Mongolian women